In triangle geometry, a triangle conic is a conic in the plane of the reference triangle and associated with it in some way. For example, the circumcircle and the incircle of the reference triangle are triangle conics. Other examples are the Steiner ellipse which is an ellipse passing through the vertices and having its centre at the centroid of the reference triangle, the Kiepert hyperbola which is a conic passing through the vertices, the centroid and the orthocentre of the reference triangle and the Artzt parabolas which are parabolas touching two sidelines of the reference triangle at vertices of the triangle. The terminology of triangle conic is widely used in the literature without a formal definition,that is, without precisely formulating the relations  a conic should have with the reference triangle so as to qualify it to be called a triangle conic (see,). WolframMathWorld has a page titled "Triangle conics" which gives a list of 42 items (not all of them are conics) without giving a definition of triangle conic. However, Paris Pamfilos in his extensive collection of topics in geometry and topics in other fields related to geometry defines a triangle conic as a "conic circumscribing a triangle ABC (that is, passing through its vertices) or inscribed in a triangle (that is, tangent to its side-lines)". The terminology triangle circle (respectively, ellipse, hyperbola, parabola) is used to denote a circle (respectively, ellipse, hyperbola, parabola) associated with the reference triangle is some way.

Even though several triangle conics have been studied individually, there is no comprehensive encyclopedia or catalogue of triangle conics similar to Karl Kimberling's Encyclopedia of Triangle Centres (which contains definitions and properties of more than 46,000 triangle centres) or Bernard Gibert's Catalog of Triangle Cubics containing detailed descriptions of more than 1200 triangle cubics.

Equations of triangle conics in trilinear coordinates
The equation of a general triangle conic in trilinear coordinates  has the form

The equations of triangle circumconics and triangle inconics have respectively the forms
 and

Special triangle conics
In the following, a few typical special triangle conics are discussed. In the descriptions, the standard notations are used: The reference triangle is always denoted by ABC. The angles at the vertices A, B, C are denoted by A, B, C and the lengths of the sides opposite to the vertices A, B, C are respectively a. b, c. The equations of the conics are given in the trilinear coordinates (x : y : z). The conics are selected as illustrative of the several different ways in which a conic could be associated with a triangle.

Triangle circles

The triangle circles are too numerous to be listed in this article. For example, in WolframMathWorld, there is a page titled "Triangle Circles" containing a list of 139 items though not all of them are circles and some of the different items are different names for the same object.

Triangle ellipses

Triangle hyperbolas

Triangle parabolas

Families of triangle conics

Hofstadter ellipses

An Hofstadter ellipse is a member of a one-parameter family of ellipses in the plane of the triangle ABC defined by the following equation in trilinear coordinates:

where t is a parameter and
.
The ellipses corresponding to t and 1 - t are identical. When  we have the inellipse

and when  we have the circumellipse

Conics of Thomson and Darboux
The family of Thomson conics consists of those conics inscribed in the reference triangle ABC having the property that the normals at the points of contact with the sidelines are concurrent. The family of Darboux conics  contains as members those circumscribed conics of the reference triangle ABC such that the normals at the vertices of ABC are concurrent. In both cases the points of concurrency lie on the Darboux cubic.

Conics associated with parallel intercepts
Given an arbitrary point in the plane of the reference triangle ABC, if lines are drawn through P parallel to the sidelines BC, CA and AB intersecting the other sides at Xb, Xc, Yc, Ya, Za, Zb then these six points of intersection lie on a conic. If P is chosen as the symmedian point, the resulting conic is a circle called the Lemoine circle. If the trilinear coordinates of P are  the equation of the six-point conic is

Yff conics

The members of the one-parameter family of conics defined by the equation 

where  is a parameter, are the Yff conics associated with the reference triangle ABC. A member of the family is associated with every point P(u : v : w) in the plane by setting

The Yff conic is a parabola if
 (say).
For , the conics are imaginary.

See also
Triangle center
Central line
Triangle cubic
 Modern triangle geometry

References

Triangle geometry